The Gopal Raj Vamshavali (IAST: Gopālarājavaṃśāvalī, Devanagari: गोपालराजवंशावली) is a 14th-century hand-written manuscript of Nepal which is primarily a genealogical record of Nepalese monarchs.

One of the most important and popular chronicles in Nepalese history is by this name. This vamshavali was previously called Bendall Vaṃśāvalī, as Prof. Cecil Bendall found the manuscript "in the cold weather of 1898–99 in Kathmandu's Durbar Library" or the Bir Library. This was later, and popularly, called the Gopālarājavaṃśāvalī by scholars as Baburam Achayra and Yogi Naraharinath to name a few, as a hand-written catalog list of the library termed the manuscript Gopālavaṃśādi prācīna rājavaṃśāvalī (गोपालवंशादि प्राचीन राजवंशावली), meaning ancient royal vamshavali starting with Gopala dynasty. Pant, however, questions if this could be called a vamshavali proper, as the chronicler never mentions it thus.

The original copy of Gopal Raj Vamshavali is now stored at National Archives, Kathmandu in an "unsatisfactory" state, in contrast to an "excellent" condition, when Prof. Cecil Bendall found it at the turn of the 19th century.

Summary 

With the advent of Kali Yuga in the primordial kingdom of Yudhisthira, Śrī Bhṛṅgāreśvara Bhaṭṭāraka emerged. There, ṛṣi (saint) Gautama came and established Gautameśvara and other deities.

Gopālas (cow-herds) came to the valley and in the Gopāla-vaṃśa, eight kings ruled for 505 years 3 months.

Thereafter, Mahiṣapāla (buffalo-herd) kings ruled up to 3 generations for 161 years 2 months. The Kiratas conquered the valley and ruled up to 32 generations for 1958 years 2 months.

Thereafter the Solar Line ruled Vimalanagarī (Vaisali?) and Nepal by defeating the Kirata kings. To name some important contributions, Śrī Supuṣpadeva enforced the varṇa system and constructed temple of Śrī Paśupati Bhaṭṭāraka. He built a town dedicated to the Lord, enforced all laws and ruled with justice. Similarly, Śrī Bhāskaradeva observed penance at Paśupati, by merit of which he conquered Kāñcinagara Maṇḍala up to southern sea. Likewise, King Śrī Haridattavarmā constructed Lord Viṣṇu Bhaṭṭāraka temple in all four śikhara-pradeśa (hillocks). Śrī Viśvadeva consecrated a caitya Bhaṭṭāraka in Sinaguṃ vihāra (Svayambhū) and set up stone water-conduit. He also installed a big trident at northern side of Śrī Paśupati. Śrī Mānadeva unknowingly killed his father and observed penance at Guṃ vihāra and consecrated a caitya and Śrī Māneśvarīdevī temple. He regulated land measurements and rent, and started the tradition of celebrating Holi. Śrī Gaṇadeva offered treasury to Śrī Paśupati Bhaṭṭāraka to cause rainfall and propitiated Mahānāga after three years of drought. Gopālas vanquished the Solar Line and ruled for three generations.

Again, the Licchavis ruled. Śrī  Aṃśuvarmā founded Rājavihāra, and started system of grammar and other branches of learning. They were from a different scion. Thereafter, the Solar dynasty ruled over Nepal again. Śrī Narendradeva initiated the festival of Śrī Lokeśvara of Bungamati and Śrī Bālārjunadeva offered his crown to Buṅga Lokeśvara Bhaṭṭāraka. Śrī Mānadeva constructed market-place; Śrī Guṇakāma deva constructed rest house and performed koti-homa (crore homas); Śrī Lakṣmīkāma deva sponsored ceremonies to bring peace in the nation (200 NS). In the same line, Śrī Bhāskaradeva sold paternal crown and destroyed the image of Śrī Māneśvarī Bhaṭṭāraka, for which he suffered a great deal. In the same line, Śrī Śivadeva completed the (re-)construction of temple of Śrī Paśupati Bhaṭṭāraka and temple of the Eastern mountain (Changu), four-storeyed royal palace with five courtyards, canals at Balkhu river, water-conduits, wells and tanks. He brought silver and gold coins in use.

With Śrī Arimalladeva's reign, a great famine and epidemic spread. A great earthquake in NS 375 (1255 AD) brought a "lot of suffering" to propitiate which annual lakṣahoma and fortnightly pakṣaśrāddha were performed. The Khaśas under Jayatāri (Jitārimalla) entered the valley for the first time from west in NS 408 (1288 AD) and were massacred in large number; next they set the villages on fire. The Tirhutiyās entered the valley in NS 411 (1291 AD). Sultān Shams Ud-dīn raided the kingdom and reduced the whole Nepal valley in ashes, including breaking of the Śrī Paśupatināṭh icon to three pieces.

Śrī Jayasthitirājamalla, brought by Śrī Devaladevī, became King upon marriage with Rājalladevī. By the grace of Svayambhū, he made several reforms. Next is described the installment of four Nārāyaṇas in all four directions.

Following this, there is a detailed description of the events from 177 NS (1057 AD), which Malla (1985)  categorizes as Vaṃśāvalī2 from folio 31. With full details of astrological dates (pañcāṅgas), this part describes the stories of birth, deaths and marriages of different kings.

In addition, it also covers events of political conflicts, religious contributions, construction works and disaster relief.

Structure 
Considering the language of this Gopal Raj Vamshavali, it can be divided broadly into two sections, viz. the Sanskrit and the Newari sections.

However, this is another popular division of the Gopal Raj Vamshavali:

 V1 (Folio 17–30a): It is in the form of annals or king-lists. It ends with the crowning of Jayasthitirājamalla in NS 503 (1383 AD). It is in Sanskrit language, but the language seems to be ungrammatical.
 V2 (Folio 30b–36a): It is a document of different origin. It lists the births of royal and distinguished personages. It begins with NS 396 (1276 AD). It is in old Newari language.
 V3 (Folio 36b–63b): It is continuation to V2 and is marked by difference in style. It begins with NS 379 (1259 AD). Chronology is not maintained in this section.
Malla (1985), however, sees no difference between V2 and V3; therefore he classifies it as only Vaṃśāvalī1 and Vaṃśāvalī2 particularly referring to the use of two different languages and styles.

Origins 
The Gopal Raj Vamshavali dates back to the 14th century during the time of King (Jaya-)Sthiti Malla (1382–1395). Pant argues that this chronicle could have been made as a personal diary for the language and verses in Sanskritlanguage is faulty, and that the King could have easily found any other pundits, much well-versed in Sanskrit, had he commissioned it himself.

Sources 
The missing first folios would perhaps have a lot to tell about the Gopal Raj Vamshavali, but the knowledge of this chronicle begins only of Licchavi period. Penned during the reign of King (Jaya-)Sthiti Malla (1382–1395 AD), details of his reign are abundantly found in this Gopal Raj Vamshavali.

The sources for the entry of King Jayasthiti Malla's reign could be what the chronicler himself saw; entries previous to it could have been sourced from other historical writings, as most are provided with full pañcaṅga details with fumbled chronology.

Themes 
Varied themes can be sorted out from this Gopal Raj Vamshavali—from that of political to religious and social works. A few of such themes for the Gopal Raj Vamshavali are listed here under:

 Power struggles among different rulers and elites, including wars, raids, violence etc.
 Governance and reforms mostly based on Hindu religious doctrines. As the purpose goes, this Gopal Raj Vamshavali also describes benevolent deeds (in praise?) of the kings.
 Maintenance of peace, social harmony and security.
 Development works and consecration, reconstruction of temples, rest houses, canals, etc.
 Cultural performances including dances, theatres, festivals, feast etc.
 Environmental concerns, especially towards coping with disasters, drought and famine etc.

References 

14th-century manuscripts
Nepalese chronicles
Social history of Nepal
Nepalese families
14th-century establishments in Nepal